Hedbergellidae is an extinct family of foraminifera belonging to the superfamily Rotaliporoidea and the suborder Globigerinina.

Genera
The family contains the following genera:
 Subfamily Hedbergellinae
 Asterohedbergella 
 Costellagerina 
 Fingeria 
 Hedbergella 
 Hillsella
 Liuenella
 Rugohedbergella 
 Trochogerina
 Whiteinella
 Subfamily Helvetoglobotruncaninae
 Globocarinata 
 Helvetroglobotruncana
 Unitruncatus 
 Subfamily Rotundininae
 Bermudeziana 
 Falsotruncana 
 Praeglobotruncana 
not assigned to a subfamily
 Globanomalina
 Microhedbergella 
 Muricohedbergella 
 Paracostellagerina 
 Paraticinella 
 Planoglobanomalina 
 Pseudoguembelitria 
 Pseudohastigerina
 Turborotalia
 Wondersella

References

External links

Foraminiferida

Foraminifera families
Globigerinina
Hauterivian first appearances
Maastrichtian extinctions